Edward Hindson (December 21, 1944 – July 2, 2022) was an American Christian evangelist and host of The King Is Coming, a syndicated television broadcast shown across the United States. Hindson wrote more than twenty books that deal with Bible prophecy and the imminent return of Jesus. He was a professor of Old Testament studies and eschatology at Liberty University in Lynchburg, Virginia, and a frequent speaker on prophecy.

Life and career
Hindson graduated from William Tyndale College in Farmington Hills, Michigan. He completed a DPhil at the University of South Africa and also held a number of degrees such as an MA and Th.D. from Trinity Evangelical Divinity School, PhD from Durham University, Doctor of Hebrew Letters Hebrew Union College-Jewish Institute of Religion, ThM from Grace Theological Seminary and D.Min. from Westminster Theological Seminary.

His show, The King Is Coming, is aired on TBN, DayStar and other Christian television networks and stations.

Hindson was named Dean of Liberty University's School of Religion on November 20, 2013.

Works

Thesis

Books

 - version of masters thesis

Edited by

Journal articles

References

External links
 The King Is Coming
 Rapture Ready Bio

1944 births
2022 deaths
American Christian theologians
William Tyndale College alumni
Trinity Evangelical Divinity School alumni